Gu Yuting (born January 14, 1995) is a Chinese table tennis player. She won a gold medal in the Women's singles event at the 2010 Summer Youth Olympics. In addition, Gu holds the distinction of having competed at the World Junior Table Tennis Championships for five straight years (2009–13) and winning the World Junior Girls' Doubles title on all five occasions.

References

External links 
 

1995 births
Living people
Chinese female table tennis players
Youth Olympic gold medalists for China
Table tennis players at the 2010 Summer Youth Olympics
Table tennis players from Shandong
People from Dongying
21st-century Chinese women